202nd may refer to:

202nd (Sportsman's) Battalion, CEF, a unit in the Canadian Expeditionary Force during WWI
202nd Division (Imperial Japanese Army), an infantry division in the Imperial Japanese Army
202nd NBC Defense Battalion (Romania), a Nuclear, Biological and Chemical protection unit of the Romanian Land Forces
202nd Weather Flight, an Air National Guard (ANG) weather flight that provides meteorological and atmospheric forecasting

See also
202 (number)
202, the year 202 (CCII) of the Julian calendar